Dewan Shafiul Arefin Tutul is a former national footballer of Bangladesh and the former Youth and Sports Affairs Secretary of Bangladesh Awami League.

Career
Tutul played for Abahani from the mid 1970s under Monwar Hossain Nannu. He was a right full back who was very good in making frequent overlaps. Thus, he is regarded as the first attacking full back in Dacca football.

In the early 1980s, Tutul played the leading role in a BTV drama depicting the story of a young footballer. The hero comes from a remote area of the country, but  becomes a top footballer in Dacca, before an injury ends his career abruptly. Nupur, a leading actress, played the role of the heroine. 

In 2001, Tutul was nominated by Awami League to contest the national elections from Manikganj-4 but lost the election to Bangladesh Nationalist Party candidate Shamsul Islam Khan.

In 2009, he was awarded the National Sports Award.

Tutul served as the youth and sports affairs secretary of Bangladesh Awami League. He served as a Director of Bangladesh Cricket Board. In April 2016, he received a nomination for the post of Vice-President of Bangladesh Football Federation. He is the councilor of Dhaka Division unit of Bangladesh Cricket Board.

References

Awami League politicians
Living people
Bangladeshi footballers
Bangladesh youth international footballers
Bangladesh international footballers
Abahani Limited (Dhaka) players
Recipients of the Bangladesh National Sports Award
Bangladeshi cricket administrators
Year of birth missing (living people)
Association footballers not categorized by position